Folorunsho Alakija (born 15 July 1951) is a Nigerian billionaire businesswoman and philanthropist. She is involved in the fashion, oil, real estate and printing industries. She is the Group Managing Director of The Rose of Sharon Group which consists of The Rose of Sharon Prints & Promotions Limited, Digital Reality Prints Limited and the executive vice-chairman of Famfa Oil Limited.

Alakija also has a majority stake in DaySpring Property Development Company. Folorunsho Alakija is ranked by Forbes as the richest woman in Nigeria with an estimated net worth of $1 billion as of 2020. As of 2015, Alakija is listed as the second most powerful woman in Africa after Ngozi Okonjo-Iweala and the 87th most powerful woman in the world by Forbes.

Early life and education
Alakija was born on 15 July 1951 to an upper-middle-class family; her father was Chief L. A. Ogbara of Ikorodu, Lagos State. Her father married 8 wives and had 52 children and Folorunso’s mother was the first. Alakija attended her nursery education at Our Ladies of Apostles, Lagos from 1955 to 1958. At the age seven, Alakija travelled to the United Kingdom to continue her primary education at Dinorben School for Girls in Hafodunos Hall in Llangernyw, Wales between 1959 and 1963. On the completion of her primary education, Alakija attended Muslim High School in Sagamu, Ogun State, Nigeria. She then returned to England for her secretarial studies at Pitman's Central College, London.

Career
Alakija started her career in 1974 as an executive secretary at Sijuade Enterprises, Lagos, Nigeria shortly after completing a Secretarial Course at Pitman's Central College London. She moved to the former First National Bank of Chicago, which later became FinBank now acquired by FCMB (First City Monument Bank) as the Executive Secretary to the managing director. She became the new Head of the Corporate Affairs Department of the International Merchant Bank of Nigeria (formerly First National Bank of Chicago), and later on became the Office Assistant to the Treasury Department. Shortly after her career in the banking world which lasted for 12 years, Alakija took up new challenge which was driven by her passion for fashion to study fashion design at The American College in London and the Central School of Fashion. After her return to Nigeria, she started her first fashion label known as Supreme Stitches, which was later renamed The Rose Of Sharon House of Fashion in 1996. Within a few years, as Rose of Sharon House of Fashion, it became a household name. As national president and lifelong trustee of the Fashion Designers Association of Nigeria (FADAN), she left an indelible mark, promoting Nigerian culture through fashion and style.

In May 1993, Alakija applied for the allocation of an oil prospecting license (OPL). The license to explore for oil on a 617,000-acre block—now referred to as OPL 216—was granted to Alakija's company, Famfa Limited. In September 1996, Alakija entered into a joint venture agreement with Star Deep Water Petroleum Limited (a wholly owned subsidiary of Texaco) and appointed the company as a technical adviser for the exploration of the license, transferring 40 percent of her 100 percent stake to Star Deep.

After they struck oil, the Nigerian government claimed a 40% stake, followed by an additional 10%. The government's argument was if Alakija and family were allowed to keep their bloc, they stood to make $10 million a day. Alakija disputed this claim and won.

Recognition
As of 2014, Alakija is listed as the 96th most powerful woman in the world by Forbes.
In May 2015, two Nigerian women, Finance Minister Ngozi okonjo-Iweala and Alakija were listed among the world's 100 most powerful women according to Forbes. She was 86th on the list.

Alakija is #20 in 2020 Africa's Billionaires list Dropped off in 2021, #1941 Billionaires 2019 Dropped off in 2020 and #80 Power Women 2016 Dropped off in 2017.

On 17 July 2021, Benson Idahosa University, Benin City gave her an honorary Doctorate Degree in Business Administration. This was in recognition of her contribution to the business world.

Philanthropy
Alakija established the Rose of Sharon Foundation that helps widows and orphans through scholarships and business grants. Alakija has donated a skills acquisition center to Yaba College of Technology (Yabatech), a higher educational institution located in Lagos.

Personal life
Alakija married a lawyer, Modupe Alakija of the Adeyemo Alakija family, in November 1976. They reside in Lagos, Nigeria, with their four sons and their grandchildren. Her nephew is DJ Xclusive.  In June 2017, Folorunso's son Folarin Alakija, married Iranian model Nazanin Jafarian Ghaissarifar in a wedding at Blenheim Palace in England. Media reports suggested the event was one of the world's most expensive weddings.

References

External links
 

1951 births
Living people
Nigerian Christians
People educated at Dinorben School for Girls
Businesspeople from Lagos
Nigerian fashion businesspeople
Nigerian businesspeople in the oil industry
Nigerian billionaires
Female billionaires
Nigerian philanthropists
20th-century Nigerian businesswomen
20th-century Nigerian businesspeople
21st-century Nigerian businesswomen
21st-century Nigerian businesspeople
Nigerian expatriates in the United Kingdom
Nigerian women company founders
Founders of charities
Nigerian real estate businesspeople
Alakija family
Nigerian corporate directors
Women corporate directors
Nigerian women fashion designers